Mark Korir (born 10 January 1985) is a Kenyan long distance runner who specialises in the marathon. He competed in the marathon event at the 2015 World Championships in Athletics in Beijing, China.

References

External links

1985 births
Living people
Kenyan male long-distance runners
Kenyan male marathon runners
World Athletics Championships athletes for Kenya
Place of birth missing (living people)
Paris Marathon male winners